Haridwar district also spelled as Hardwar is a district in Garhwal which is a part of Uttarakhand, India. It is headquartered at Haridwar which is also its largest city. The district is ringed by the districts Dehradun in the north and east, Pauri Garhwal in the east and the Uttar Pradesh districts of Muzaffarnagar and Bijnor in the south and Saharanpur in the west.

Haridwar district came into existence on 28 December 1988 as part of Saharanpur Divisional Commissionary, On 24 September 1998 Uttar Pradesh Legislative Assembly passed the 'Uttar Pradesh Reorganisation Bill', 1998', eventually the Parliament also passed the Indian Federal Legislation – 'Uttar Pradesh Reorganisation Act 2000', and thus on 9 November 2000, it is the only university in the world dedicated to studies of ancient Sanskrit scriptures and books. Its curriculum also covers ancient Hindu rituals, traditions and culture, and it boasts of a building inspired by ancient Hindu architecture style.
State Ayuevedic College & Hospital Rishikul, Haridwar, is the oldest Ayurvedic Medical College of India. It is situated near Devpura in Haridwar on the banks of Upper Ganges Canal. It is also providing postgraduate education for Ayurveda. Soon it will be transformed as the first Ayuevedic University of Uttarakhand.
Govt Ayurvedic College & Hospital, Gurukul Kangri of HNB Garhwal University is also one of the oldest Ayurvedic medical colleges in India. It is situated in Gurukul Kangri University Campus.
Dev Sanskriti Vishwavidyalaya: established in 2002 by the act of the Uttarnchal Government is a fully residential university. Run by Sri Vedmata Gayatri Trust, Shantikunj Haridwar (headquarters of All World Gayatri Pariwar), it provides various degree, diploma and certificate courses in areas like Yogic Science, Alternative Therapy, Indian Culture, Tourism, Rural Management, Theology (Dharm Vigyan), Spiritual Counseling etc. It also provides distance learning courses.
Sheel Institute Situated in Shivalik Nagar,  from Haridwar city. one of the Best Computer Institute in Haridwar.

Modern Ashrams are also being established in the district for imparting training in yoga and meditation to people coming now from near and far, including foreign countries of the West :

Shantikunj Ashram provides a 9 days camp and one month / three months courses covering yoga, meditation, art of living, scientific spirituality etc.

Religious festivals and fairs

Being a place of intense religious significance, Haridwar also hosts several religious festivals throughout the year; popular among them are the Kavad Mela, Somvati Amavasya Mela, Ganga Dashara, Gughal Mela, in which around 2–2.5 million people take part.

Apart from these, there is the mammoth Kumbh Mela which takes place once in every twelve years, when the planet Jupiter (Brihaspati) comes into the sign Aquarius (Kumbha). First written evidence of the Kumbha Mela can be found in the accounts of Chinese traveller Huan Tsang or Xuanzang (602 – 664 A.D.), who visited India in 629 CE. The 1998 Maha Kumbh Mela saw over 80 million pilgrims visiting this city, to take a dip in the holy river Ganges.

Places of pilgrimage

Har ki Pauri: One of the holiest spots on earth for the Hindus, this ancient bathing ghat (Steps) is of prime importance. A majority of the present ghats were largely developed in the 1800s.

Sati Kund: It is the well-known mythological Sati immolation heritage situated in Kankhal.

Daksheswara Mahadev Temple: The ancient temple of Daksha Mahadev, also known as Daksheswara Mahadev Temple, is situated in the south of Kankhal town and is a tribute to the legends of Sati's self-immolated and king Daksha's death and later life with a goat's head.

Maya Devi Temple: This temple of the Adhisthatri deity of Haridwar is considered one of the Siddhapeethas and is said to be the place where the heart and navel of Goddess Sati had fallen. It is one of the few ancient temples still standing in Haridwar, along with Narayani Shila Temple and Bhairav Temple.

Sapt Rishi Ashram and Sapt Rishi Sarovar, where the Ganges split herself into seven currents so that seven great sages on its bank would not be disturbed by the flow.

Bhimgoda Tank: This tank, where Bhima is said to have drawn water from the rocks by thrusting his knee into the ground, is situated at a distance of about 1 km from Har-ki-Pauri.

Chandi Devi Temple:  The present temple, commemorating the ancient Chandi legend, was constructed in 1929 CE by the Dogra King of Kashmir, Suchat Singh; it can also be reached through a ropeway.

Mansa Devi Temple:  The temple dedicated to Mansa Devi, a form of Shakti draws many pilgrims. There are two ways to reach the temple – trekking or it can also be reached through a ropeway.

Piran Kaliyar Sharif: This famous 'Dargah' (Shrine) of Hazrat Alauddin Sabir Kaliyari, a 13th-century Sufi Saint of Chishti Order, was built by Ibrahim Lodhi, a Delhi Sultanate ruler. Also known as Sarkar Sabir Pak, it is located in Kaliyar village, 7 km from Roorkee, and is a living example of religious harmony in India; it is visited by devotees from all over the world, during the annual 'Urs' festival, which is celebrated from 1st day (of sighting the new moon) to 16th day of Rabee-ul-awwal month of Islamic calendar.

 Rama Mandir: This Rama temple is under construction at Bhupatwala and would be the biggest in size in India.

Shantikunj: Shantikunj is headquarters of spiritual and social organisation All World Gayatri Pariwar (AWGP). Founder of the organisation, Pt. Shriram Sharma Acharya, was a great saint, spiritual leader and freedom fightor. He spent last twenty years of his life here, writing literature and directing activities of the organisation. Shantikunj is considered as a place of pilgrimage by millions of devotees of this global organisation.

Transportation
National Highway 58, between Delhi and Mana Pass, passes through Haridwar. Indian Railways links Haridwar Railway Station to all parts of India. The nearest airport is Jolly Grant Airport, Dehradun, 45 kilometres from Haridwar, though Indira Gandhi International Airport in New Delhi is preferred.

References

External links
 The Official Website of District Haridwar.
 Photos of Haridwar, 1280x960, published by the author

Further reading

 Chapter XVII: Himalayas, Hardwar. India, Past and Present, by Charles Harcourt Ainslie Forbes-Lindsay. Published by J.C. Winston, 1903.

 
Districts of Uttarakhand
Hindu pilgrimage sites in India
Tourism in Uttarakhand
Shaivism
Vaishnavism
Minority Concentrated Districts in India